Nkululeko Mkastos Sibanda (21 January 1979) is  politician.  He was born in Gwelo, Rhodesia in 1979 to a family descending from the Tswana people.

Politics

Students' Union and Human Rights Activism 

Sibanda began challenging authority in high school and when he went to College he was elected a member of the Student Representative Council, rising through the ranks until he became president of the National Union of Students in Polytechnic and Technical Colleges (NUSPOTECH). In December 2000 he was elected President of the Zimbabwe National Students Union (ZINASU).  He continuously challenged the government on the privatisation of education and the lack of basic human rights in the country.  He championed the calls for democratic change in the country.

He was the Steering Committee Youth Representative of the Crisis in Zimbabwe Coalition, Board Member of the Zimbabwe Election Support Network, youth committee member of the National Constitutional Assembly amongst other political roles in the country. In 2001, he travelled to South America to attend the Peoples Global Action summit where he met autonomous groups such as the Zapastistas of Mexico amongst others, including Brazil's Landless People's Movement.

Sibanda's achievements include becoming the President of the Zimbabwe National Students Union (ZINASU) becoming the only person to lead ZINASU without being a University student.  During his term of office ZINASU won the International Student Peace Prize in Norway.

Movement for Democratic Change (MDC) 

After leaving ZINASU he spent 1 year and 9 months with the Movement for Democratic Change working in the Office of the President carrying out various responsibilities including Co-ordinating the Broad Alliance and engaging regional ambassadors on the issues of Zimbabwe. Sibanda then left the country in 2004 and returned to active Zimbabwe politics in 2018, when he was appointed the President Spokesperson by MDC President Nelson Chamisa

Nkululeko Sibanda is the current Spokesperson for Nelson Chamisa, who is the President of Zimbabwe's Movement for Democratic Change and is thought to have won the July 2018 Presidential elections in the country, before the military stepped in and forced the announcement of Emmerson Mnangagwa as the winner, including the subsequent confirmation by a partisan Supreme Court, sitting as a Constitutional Court.

Sibanda held the Press Conference that cast the 1 August 2018 military murders onto the world scene and brought the attention that led to the world recognising that Mnangagwa was not a reformist. At the Press Conference, Sibanda faced a barrage of unfriendly questions from the media, including ITV, BBC and SABC, but he stood his ground and forcefully stated that, no matter what excuses could be conjured up, it was wrong for the military use live ammunition on reporters. With his calm, uncompromising and some say slightly arrogant but forceful posture Sibanda faces the media with a style that is unusual and yet seems to simply state the facts.
 
Sibanda is currently a troll target of the ZANU PF twitter bots and activists known as varakashi. He hardly posts anything without being bombarded with negative comments from the same group of twitter usernames. Sibanda is also noticeably not concerned by these bots and is regularly reminded by Zimbabweans not to worry about responding to accounts operated by ZANU PF.

TV personality
Sibanda is also a TV personality who co-founded and co-presents with Baillor Jalloh. It's a weekly TV Show on Sheffield Live in Sheffield in the United Kingdom. The TV programme covers issues relating to Africans in the diaspora, bringing high level discussions and analysis of top news items on Africa and African in Sheffield and elsewhere in the world.

Education
 Doctoral Degree in International Relations and Politics - (PhD) University of Huddersfield.
 Master of Arts Degree in Education (Outstanding) - (MEd) University of Huddersfield.
 Post Graduate Diploma in Education (Outstanding) - (PGDE) University of Huddersfield.
 Master of Arts Degree in Social Change, University of Leeds
 Bachelor of Arts Degree (Hons) in Social Policy, Sheffield Hallam University.
 Bachelor of Arts Degree (Hons) in Human and Social Studies with speciality in Public Policy, University of South Africa.
 Higher National Diploma in Accountancy, Bulawayo Polytechnic (was expelled from college on the orders of the Minister of Higher Education thus transferred to study with the University of South Africa)

References

1979 births
People from Gweru
Zimbabwean politicians
Living people
Alumni of the University of Leeds
University of South Africa alumni
Alumni of Sheffield Hallam University
Alumni of the University of Huddersfield